The following is a list of ancient Greek vase painters who have been identified either by name or by style. Because of the research of academics like John Davidson Beazley, Arthur Dale Trendall, Robert Manuel Cook, Darrell A. Amyx and Conrad Stibbe more than 2800 individual painters are known.

Geometric period 
Dipylon Master

Orientalizing period 
Analatos Painter
Honolulu Painter
Mesogeia Painter

Black-figure period 

Acheloos Painter
Affecter
Amasis Painter
Ampersand Painter
Anakles
Andokides Painter
Antimenes Painter
Athena Painter
Beldam Painter
Bellerophon Painter
Castellani Painter
Cerameicus Painter
Chimera Painter
Chiusi Painter
Daybreak Painter
Diosphos Painter
Edinburgh Painter
Elbows Out
Ergoteles
Eucharides Painter
Euphiletos Painter
Exekias
Gela Painter
Goltyr Painter
Gorgon Painter
Haimon Painter
Heidelberg Painter
Kleitias
KX Painter
Lion Painter
Lydos
Lysippides Painter
Madrid Painter
Mastos Painter
Nearchos
Nessos Painter
Nikosthenes
Nikoxenos Painter
Panther Painter
Phrynos Painter
Piraeus Painter
Polos Painter
Priam Painter
Princeton Painter
Psiax
Ptoon Painter
Rycroft Painter
Sophilos
Swing Painter
Taleides Painter
Theseus Painter

Red-figure archaic period 

Achilles Painter
Andokides Painter
Apollodoros (vase painter)
Berlin Painter
Brygos Painter
Bryn Mawr Painter
Dokimasia Painter
Douris (vase painter)
Epiktetos
Eucharides Painter
Euphronios
Euthymides
Foundry Painter
Harrow Painter
Hermonax
Kleophrades Painter
Makron (vase painter)
Onesimos (vase painter)
Pan Painter
Pheidippos
Phintias (painter)
Providence Painter
Psiax
Siren Painter
Skythes
Smikros
Tithonos Painter
Triptolemos Painter

Red-figure classical period 

Achilles Painter
Aison (vase painter)
Altamura Painter
Aristophanes (vase painter)
Chrysis Painter
Codrus Painter
Dinos Painter
Eretria Painter
Hasselmann Painter
Jena Painter
Meleager Painter
Niobid Painter
Oreithyia painter
Penthesilea Painter
Phiale Painter
Pistoxenos Painter
Polygnotos (vase painter)
Reed Painter
Shuvalov Painter
Tarquinia Painter

South Italian and Sicilian red-figure vase painters 

Asteas
Baltimore Painter
Darius Painter
Ilioupersis Painter
Marsyas Painter
Python
Tarporley Painter
Underworld Painter
Varrese Painter

See also 
 Art in ancient Greece
 Black-figure pottery
 Geometric art
 Greek terracotta figurines
 Minoan pottery
 National Archaeological Museum of Athens
 Pottery of ancient Greece
 Red-figure pottery

Sources
Paolo Enrico Arias, Max Hirmer, and B. B. Shefton. A History of Greek Vase Painting. London: Thames and Hudson Publishing, 1962.
Robert Manuel Cook. Greek Painted Pottery. London: Methuen Publishing, 1972.
Tom Rasmussen and Nigel Jonathan Spivey. Looking at Greek Vases. Cambridge [England], New York: Cambridge University Press, 1991.

External links 

The Perseus Project - List of Vase Painters
Ancient Greek Pottery

!
Vase painters
Greek vase